Michael August Blume (born May 30, 1946) is an American prelate of the Catholic Church who worked in the Roman Curia from 1995 to 2005 and then in the diplomatic service of the Holy See as an Apostolic Nuncio until retiring at the end of 2021.

Biography 
Michael August Blume was born on August 30, 1946, in South Bend, Indiana. A member of the Society of the Divine Word, he was ordained a priest on December 23, 1972, by Auxiliary Bishop Joseph Crowley in the Diocese of Fort Wayne-South Bend, Indiana.

Blume earned a bachelor's degree in mathematics and a theology degree at the Pontifical Gregorian University. From 1975 to 1983 he taught theology at the regional seminary in Cape Coast, Ghana. From 1983 to 1990 he was provincial of the Society of the Divine Word in Ghana, Benin, and Togo, and secretary general of the Society from 1990 to 1994.

On April 8, 2000, Blume was named under secretary of the Pontifical Council for the Pastoral Care of Migrants and Itinerants, having founded its press service in April 1995.On August 24, 2005, Pope Benedict XVI appointed him titular archbishop of Alexanum and apostolic nuncio to both Benin and Togo. He was consecrated a bishop on September 30, 2005, by Cardinal Angelo Sodano, Vatican secretary of state. Pope Benedict appointed him apostolic nuncio to Uganda on February 2, 2013.

Pope Francis named him apostolic nuncio to Hungary on July 4, 2018, and accepted his resignation on 31 December 2021.

See also
 List of heads of the diplomatic missions of the Holy See

References

External links 

 Catholic Hierarchy: Archbishop Michael August Blume, S.V.D. 

Apostolic Nuncios to Uganda
Apostolic Nuncios to Hungary
Apostolic Nuncios to Benin
Apostolic Nuncios to Togo
Divine Word Missionaries Order
People from South Bend, Indiana
Officials of the Roman Curia
Pontifical Council for the Pastoral Care of Migrants and Itinerants
1946 births
Living people